Vallankumouksellinen Nuorisoliitto (Revolutionary Youth League), a political youth organization in Finland during the 1980s. VKN was the youth wing of Demokraattinen Vaihtoehto (Democratic Alternative). VKN had 3,250 members at one point.

Youth wings of political parties in Finland